The 1924 United States Senate elections were elections for the United States Senate which coincided with the election of Republican President Calvin Coolidge to a full term. The 32 seats of Class 2 were contested in regular elections, and special elections were held to fill vacancies. The strong economy and Coolidge's popularity helped Republican candidates increase their majority by 3.

Gains, losses, and holds

Retirements
Three Republicans and two Democrats retired instead of seeking re-election.

Defeats
Four Democrats, four Republicans, and one Farmer-Labor sought re-election but lost in the primary or general election.

Post-Election Changes
One Republican was elected in 1924, but was replaced by the losing Democrat after objections were made in the Senate in 1926.

Change in composition

Before the elections 
At the beginning of 1924.

Elections results

Race summaries

Special elections during the 68th Congress 
In these special elections, the winners were seated during 1924 or before March 4, 1925; ordered by election date.

Elections leading to the 69th Congress 
In these general elections, the winners were elected for the term beginning March 4, 1925; ordered by state.

All of the elections involved the Class 2 seats.

Closest races 
Eight races had a margin of victory under 10%:

The tipping point state is Wyoming with a margin of 10.4%.

Alabama

Arkansas

Colorado

Colorado (special)

Colorado (regular)

Connecticut (special)

Delaware

Georgia

Idaho

Illinois

Iowa 

Democrat Daniel F. Steck successfully challenged the election and the Senate awarded Steck the seat on April 12, 1926.

Kansas

Kentucky

Louisiana

Maine

Massachusetts

Michigan

Michigan (special)

Michigan (regular)

Minnesota

Mississippi

Montana 

Incumbent Democrat Thomas J. Walsh, who was first elected to the Senate in 1912 by the state legislature (as was the practice then), and re-elected in 1918 by popular vote (in accordance with the 17th Amendment), ran for re-election. He was unopposed in the Democratic primary.

He faced former State Representative Frank Bird Linderman and several other opponents in the general election. Walsh ultimately won re-election to his third term by a solid margin.

Nebraska

New Hampshire

New Jersey

New Mexico

North Carolina

Oklahoma

Oregon

Rhode Island

Rhode Island (special)

Rhode Island (regular)

South Carolina

South Dakota

Tennessee

Texas

Virginia

West Virginia

Wyoming

See also
 1924 United States elections
 1924 United States presidential election
 1924 United States House of Representatives elections
 68th United States Congress
 69th United States Congress

Notes

References